The Art Academy of Cincinnati is a private college of art and design in Cincinnati, Ohio, accredited by the National Association of Schools of Art and Design. It was founded as the McMicken School of Design in 1869, and was a department of the University of Cincinnati, and later in 1887, became the Art Academy of Cincinnati, the museum school of the Cincinnati Art Museum.

In 1998, the Art Academy of Cincinnati legally separated from the museum and became an independent college of art and design. Degrees granted are the Associate of Science in Graphic Design; the Bachelor of Fine Arts in Creative Writing, Design, Illustration, Painting and Drawing, Photography, Print Media, and Sculpture; and the Master of Arts in Art Education, which is taught during summer semesters.

The Art Academy moved into its current facility at 1212 Jackson St. in the Over-the-Rhine neighborhood in the fall of 2005. This move has been pivotal in the Over-the-Rhine revitalization and renovation as an arts district. The new facility provides 24-hour access for students with around the clock security. Students are guaranteed studio spaces in Junior and Senior years. The 12th and Jackson St. building also has an open air atrium, connecting two formerly separate buildings, enlarged classroom spaces, computer labs, a student commons area, lecture hall, and Learning Services Center. In 2008, the Art Academy facility received Leadership in Energy and Environment Design (LEED) Green Building certification by the United States Green Building Council (USGBC).

AAC housing is required for out-of-town Art Academy freshmen at the Academy Housing Facility at the nearby corner of 12th and Vine streets. Spaces are also available to local freshmen. Twelve suites for 28 students are available each with fully equipped kitchens and with washer and dryer. A Resident Advisor is also available and lives on the premises.

Notable alumni and faculty
 Wilbur G. Adam (1898–1973) divided his career between Cincinnati and Chicago and is best known as a portrait painter and for his landscapes of western United States.
 Josef Albers (1888-1976) was a German-born American artist and educator whose work, both in Europe and in the United States, formed the basis of modern art education programs of the twentieth century. He taught at the Art Academy of Cincinnati in 1949.
 Paul Chidlaw (1900–1989) was a modern American painter and long-time instructor at the Academy. Chidlaw Gallery is named after him.
 Petah Coyne, is an internationally recognized sculptor and installation artist.
 Jenny Eakin Delony,(aka: Jenny Delony, Jenny Meyrowitz, Jenny Eakin Delony Rice) (1866–1949) was an American painter and educator. She specialized in portraiture, but her subject matter also included miniatures, landscape, wildlife, still life, and genre.
 Frank Duveneck (1848–1919) was an American figure and portrait painter who taught at the Art Academy during the 1890s and later became its chairman. He notably fought with the Cincinnati Art Museum administration for students' right to study directly from the live nude model.
 Frances Farrand Dodge (1878 - 1969) was a US artist and teacher, appreciated by critics for her skillful command of all media, namely oil, pencil, etching, watercolors.
 James Flora (1914–1998) idiosyncratic album cover illustrator for RCA Victor and Columbia Records during the 1940s and 1950s, commercial illustrator, fine artist, and author/illustrator of seventeen popular children's books
 Tim Folzenlogen is a contemporary realist painter based in New York City.
 Daniel Garber (1880–1958) was an American landscape painter and member of the art colony at New Hope, Pennsylvania.
 Marie Bruner Haines (1885–1979), painter and illustrator
 Charley Harper (1922–2007) was a Cincinnati-based American Modernist artist, best known for his highly stylized wildlife prints, posters and book illustrations.
 Eli Harvey (1860-1957) American sculptor, painter and animalier.
 Maud Hunt Squire (1873 – 1954) American painter and printmaker.
 Edna Boies Hopkins (1872-1937) American artist of woodblock prints.
 Louise Lawson (1860s–1899), American sculptor.
 Noel Martin, graphic designer who revolutionized type and publication standards for American museums, and later a professor at The Art Academy of Cincinnati, as well as The University of Cincinnati.
 Lewis Henry Meakin (1850-1917)
 Lê Hiền Minh (born 1979), installation artist
 Myra Musselmann-Carr (b. 1880) was a sculptor who exhibited at the Armory Show in 1913.
 Frank Harmon Myers (1899–1956) was an American painter. His work includes a variety of topics but he is best known for his seascapes.
 Thomas Satterwhite Noble (1835-1907) was an American painter and teacher.
 Elizabeth Nourse (1859-1938) Realist and Genre painter later based in Paris. Best known for her depictions of peasant women.
 Roy Cleveland Nuse (1885-1975) was a Pennsylvania Impressionist artist and a respected teacher at the Pennsylvania Academy of the Fine Arts.

 Anna Oliver (1840–1892), American preacher (attended)
 Ruthe Katherine Pearlman (1913-2007), Cincinnati-based artist and educator who was working with Art Beyond Boundaries from its inception in 2005, Pearlman gallery is named after her.
 Louis Rebisso (1837–1899) sculptor and teacher whose students at CAA included William Jacob Baer, Solon Borglum, Janet Scudder, Mary Chase Perry, Louise Lawson, and Eli Harvey.
 John Ruthven (1927-2020) American artist best known for wildlife paintings.
 Paul Sawyier (1865–1917) was a Kentucky artist and an American impressionist.
 Joseph Henry Sharp, (1873-1892), was one of the six founding members of the Taos Society of Artists.
 Mary Given Sheerer (1865-1954), ceramicist and instructor affiliated with Newcomb Pottery.
 Harry Shokler (18961978) was a 20th-century American artist known for his oil paintings and screen prints.
 Julian Stanczak, is an internationally recognized abstract painter, founder of the Op Art movement.
 Tony Tasset (b.1960), American multimedia artist.
 Edward Charles Volkert (1871–1935) a Cincinnati-based post-impressionist painter who was known for his oil and watercolor cattle paintings from the Old Lyme Art Colony.
 John Ellsworth Weis (1892-1962) graduate and faculty member
 Tom Wesselmann (February 23, 1931 – December 17, 2004) pop artist of The Great American Nude series of paintings.

Galleries
The college features three public galleries that offer changing art exhibitions, the Pearlman Gallery, the Chidlaw Gallery and the Convergys Gallery. Exhibitions include emerging and professional artists, students, faculty and alumni artists.

References

External links

Art Academy of Cincinnati • circa 1912

 
Art schools in Ohio
Arts in Cincinnati
Universities and colleges in Cincinnati
Educational institutions established in 1869
Educational institutions established in 1887
Art museums and galleries in Ohio
Greater Cincinnati Consortium of Colleges and Universities
University of Cincinnati
1869 establishments in Ohio
1887 establishments in Ohio
Over-the-Rhine
Private universities and colleges in Ohio